Gonystylus micranthus grows as a tree up to  tall, with a trunk diameter of up to . Bark is dark brown. Its habitat is forest from sea-level to  altitude. G. micranthus is endemic to Borneo.

References

micranthus
Endemic flora of Borneo
Trees of Borneo
Plants described in 1950